Carlos Armando Ponce Freyre Jr. (born September 4, 1972) is a Puerto Rican actor, musician, model, and television personality. Ponce began his acting career by participating in Spanish language soap operas for Televisa and Telemundo. Ponce continued to expand his acting career by participating in various American television series. He did not limit himself solely to a career in television. Ponce, who is also a singer, is also active in the American movie industry as a character actor. In film, he played Salvadore in Couples Retreat, Matthew Wright in Spy and Rodrigo in Deuce Bigalow: European Gigolo. In television, he played Felix Gonzalez in Cristela, Max Duran in Hollywood Heights, as well as voicing Santiago Santos in Maya & Miguel.

Early life
Ponce was born in Santurce, Puerto Rico. His parents, Carlos Ponce Sr. and Esther Freyre, emigrated from Cuba after the Cuban Revolution led by Fidel Castro. After his birth, the family moved to Humacao, where Ponce was raised. As a child, he actively participated in his school's plays and at home he would often put on a show for the family where he would sing the latest tunes. "Carlitos", as he is known in Puerto Rico, started to appear in television commercials at the age of six. He attended high school in Humacao and was a member of the school's drama club.

In 1986, the Ponce family moved to Miami, Florida, and Ponce continued to participate in his school's productions at South Miami Senior High. He was named the best student actor of the southern region of the United States .

In 1990, Ponce participated in the Southeastern Theatre Conference and competed for the chance to win a scholarship. He won and enrolled in the New World School of the Arts conservatory. However, the Spanish-language television station Univision offered Ponce the opportunity to host a show called Hablando (Talking). This was his first serious television debut and after his debut he gave up his university studies.

Career

Acting 
After Hablando came to its end, Ponce went to Mexico to visit a friend. While there he visited the Televisa television station. The talent director of the station met Ponce and offered Ponce his first role in a soap opera: Guadalupe, starring Adela Noriega and Eduardo Yáñez. He participated in another soap opera for Televisa, Sentimientos Ajenos, in which he played the main character. Ponce also sang the theme song for the production. He received the "Actor Revelation of 1997 Award" by Eres magazine and named "Best Actor" by TV y Novelas magazine (both are Mexican publications).

In between productions, Ponce returned to Miami and Univision hired him as the host of a new show, Control. He hosted the show for three years and won an "ACE Award".

In 2003, Ponce joined Entertainment Tonight as a correspondent. He also hosted An Entertainment Tonight Event — Celebrity Weddings Unveiled, a CBS primetime special. Ponce hosted the 2006 Miss Universe pageant in Los Angeles, with Shandi Finnessey, Nancy O'Dell and Carson Kressley. In 2007, he starred in the Telemundo NBC Universal telenovela Dame Chocolate (Give Me Chocolate) alongside Génesis Rodríguez and Karla Monroig. Ponce also starred in Perro Amor in 2010 on the same network. In 2012, Ponce began hosting the hit Puerto Rican singing competition for kids on Wapa Television called Idol Kids Puerto Rico. In 2013, Ponce appeared on Telemundo's Santa Diabla as Humberto Cano.

American film industry 
In 1998, he made his debut in American television with his participation in the TV series Beverly Hills, 90210 and 7th Heaven where he played the husband of Jessica Biel's character Mary Camden. He also made guest appearances in Live with Regis and Kathie Lee and in Donny & Marie.

In 2003, Ponce played himself in the movie Chasing Papi alongside fellow Latinos: Puerto Ricans Roselyn Sánchez, Lisa Vidal, Walter Mercado, Colombian actress Sofía Vergara, and Latin pop singer Jaci Velásquez. After this experience, he went to New Zealand to film Meet Me in Miami.

In 2005, Ponce briefly appeared in the movie Deuce Bigalow: European Gigolo.

In 2006, Ponce participated in the controversial recording of the Spanish-language version of the Star-Spangled Banner, called "Nuestro Himno", alongside Wyclef Jean, Gloria Trevi, and Olga Tañón. He hosted the Miss Universe 2006 pageant in Los Angeles, along with Nancy O'Dell and Carson Kressley. He also appeared in the movie Just My Luck, with Lindsay Lohan, Chris Pine, and McFly.

In 2008, Ponce starred as a celebrity judge alongside actress and singer María Conchita Alonso on VH1's reality series ¡Viva Hollywood!, which featured twelve Latino actors competing for the title of "America's Numero Uno Telenovela Star".

In 2009, Ponce starred in the second season of Lipstick Jungle, where he played a character named Rodrigo. He later stated that he accepted the role because it could "benefit" his career. Also that year, he appeared in Couples Retreat as a yoga instructor.

From 2014 to 2015, Ponce co-starred in the ABC comedy Cristela as Felix, the male lead on the show.

In 2020, Carlos appeared in Julie and the Phantoms as the titular character's father, Ray Molina.

Music 
In 1998, Emilio Estefan Jr. and Kike Santander signed Ponce to a record contract. His first album was entitled Carlos Ponce, and included three of his own compositions. The album reached the #1 spot in the Latin Billboards for nine weeks in the Hispanic community of the United States. It also reached the #1 spot in Central America and South America. He was awarded a Double Platinum Award for the sales which his album generated.

On the Billboard Hot Latin Tracks Carlos Ponce reached the number-one spot three times with "Rezo" (I Pray), "Decir Adiós" (Say Good-Bye) and "Escúchame" (Listen to Me).

In 1999, Ponce recorded his second studio album, Todo lo que Soy (Everything that I Am). The World Athletic Games held in Seville, Spain, adopted the song "Amelia" from Ponce's second album as its official theme. That same year, he was contracted by the Walt Disney Studios to sing "Bella Notte" for the animated film Lady and the Tramp II: Scamp's Adventure. He also appeared in ABC's drama series Once and Again.

After the tragedy of the September 11, 2001 attacks, Ponce joined a group of 100 Latin American singers, who united to pay tribute to the victims by recording "Último Adiós" ("Last Good-Bye"). The proceeds of the recording were donated to families of the victims. That same year Ponce participated in the Televisa production Sin Pecado Concebido, along with Mexican actress Angélica Rivera. In 2002, he recorded his third studio album, Ponce; later that year he signed a contract with Telemundo to host a reality show called Protagonista de la Musica, which became one of the most popular Hispanic programs in the U.S. and Puerto Rico.

Personal life
Ponce married his high school sweetheart, photographer Verónica Rubio, the sister of current U.S. Senator Marco Rubio. They resided in Miami, Florida, with their four children: Giancarlo (born 1999), Sebastián (born 2001), and twins Savannah and Sienna (born 2002). In 2010, the couple divorced.

From 2010 to 2016, he was in a relationship with Colombian actress Ximena Duque.

In 2018, he began a relationship with Mexican television host Karina Banda. They married in December 2020.

Filmography

Discography
2012: Me Llevas
2010: Perro Amor
2005: Celebrando 15 Años Con
2003: La Historia
2002: Ponce
1999: Todo Lo Que Soy
1998: Carlos Ponce

Soundtrack
2011: "Rendirme En Tu Amor" feat. Anahí (telenovela Dos Hogares)
2013: "Santa Diabla" feat. Aaron Diaz (telenovela Santa Diabla)

Billboard Hot Latin Tracks chart chronology

Awards
In 1999, Ponce received many awards, including:
"Best Pop Album" from Billboard magazine
"Artist Revelation" from Premios Lo Nuestro and
"Pop Ballad Revelation of the Year" from Premios Tu Musica de Puerto Rico.

See also

List of Puerto Ricans
List of Puerto Rican songwriters
List of composers by nationality
List of television presenters/Puerto Rico

Notes

References

External links
 CarlosPonce.com
 Carlos Ponce on Telemundo

1972 births
Living people
20th-century Puerto Rican male actors
20th-century Puerto Rican male singers
20th-century Puerto Rican singers
21st-century Puerto Rican male actors
21st-century Puerto Rican male singers
21st-century Puerto Rican singers
American infotainers
EMI Latin artists
Male actors from Miami
Male actors from San Juan, Puerto Rico
Male beauty pageant winners
People from Humacao, Puerto Rico
People from Santurce, Puerto Rico
Puerto Rican male film actors
Puerto Rican male telenovela actors
Puerto Rican male television actors
Puerto Rican people of Cuban descent
Puerto Rican singer-songwriters
Singers from San Juan, Puerto Rico